Arasalamkarambai is a very small village in Peravurani taluk, Thanjavur district, Tamil Nadu, India. Total geographical area of the village is 320.98 hectares.

Demographics
Arasalamkarambai has only two families residing in it. The total population of the village is 5 only. 3 males and 2 females are residing here. The literacy rate is 75%: the male rate is 50% and that for females is 100%.

References

Villages in Thanjavur district